Friedrichsthal is a town and a municipality in the district of Saarbrücken, of Saarland, Germany. It is situated approximately 13 km northeast of Saarbrücken.

Friedrichsthal (Saar) station is located on the Bingen (Rhein)–Saarbrücken railway.

History
In 1723 the place was founded with a glass foundry by Frederick Louis, Count of Nassau-Ottweiler.

Sons and daughters of the city

 Johannes Driessler (1921-1998), composer
 Manfred Römbell (1941-2010), writer

References

Saarbrücken (district)